The 1949–50 Illinois Fighting Illini men’s basketball team represented the University of Illinois.

Regular season
The 1949-50 season looked to have solid promise based on the fact that the team had 3 returning starters from a "Final Four" team a year earlier.  Unfortunately for the Fighting Illini men's basketball team, the conference season proved to be more difficult than expected.  With 5 of the team's 8 losses coming at the hands of conference competition, the Illini, not only placed in a third place tie in the Big Ten, they also missed out on the opportunity to play in a post-season tournament.  Head coach Harry Combes had guided the team a year earlier to a Big Ten championship, a third place finish in the 1949 NCAA Men's Division I Basketball Tournament and a final AP ranking of No. 4 in the nation.  The 1949-50 team compiled an overall record of 14 wins and 8 losses with a conference record of 7 wins and 5 losses.  The starting lineup included captain William Erickson, Roy Gatewood and Donald Sunderlage as forwards, Rodney Fletcher, and Burdette Thurlby at guard and Walter Osterkorn and Mack Follmer rotating at the center position.

Roster

Source

Schedule
												
Source																
												

|-
!colspan=12 style="background:#DF4E38; color:white;"| Non-Conference regular season

						

|-
!colspan=9 style="background:#DF4E38; color:#FFFFFF;"|Big Ten regular season

|-

Rankings

Player stats

Awards and honors
Bill Erickson
Converse Honorable Mention All-American (1950)
Wally Osterkorn
Team Most Valuable Player

Team players drafted into the NBA

Rankings

References

Illinois Fighting Illini
Illinois Fighting Illini men's basketball seasons
1949 in sports in Illinois
1950 in sports in Illinois